Francisco Bilbao is an underground metro station on the Line 4 of the Santiago Metro, in Santiago, Chile. It is located under the intersection of Tobalaba Avenue and Francisco Bilbao Avenue. The latter avenue, which is named after Francisco Bilbao, gives its name to the station. The station was opened on 30 November 2005 as part of the inaugural section of the line between Tobalaba and Grecia.

References

Santiago Metro stations
Santiago Metro Line 4